Kierra Smith (born February 1, 1994) is a Canadian breaststroke swimmer. She won a gold medal in the 200 m breaststroke at the 2015 Pan American Games and a silver medal in the 200m breaststroke at the 2018 Commonwealth Games.

Career

2016 season
In 2016, she was officially named to Canada's Olympic team for the 2016 Summer Olympics.

2017 season
In September 2017, Smith was named to Canada's 2018 Commonwealth Games team.

International Swimming League 
In the Autumn of 2019 she was member of the inaugural International Swimming League swimming for the Energy Standard International Swim Club, who won the team title in Las Vegas, Nevada, in December.

2020 season
In June 2021, Smith was officially named to Canada's Olympic team for the 2020 Summer Olympics (taking place in 2021 due to the Covid-19 Pandemic)

References

External links
 
 
 
 
 
 
 
 

1994 births
Living people
Canadian female breaststroke swimmers
Swimmers from Vancouver
Sportspeople from Kelowna
Swimmers at the 2014 Commonwealth Games
Swimmers at the 2011 Pan American Games
Swimmers at the 2015 Pan American Games
Pan American Games gold medalists for Canada
Pan American Games silver medalists for Canada
Swimmers at the 2016 Summer Olympics
Olympic swimmers of Canada
Commonwealth Games medallists in swimming
Pan American Games medalists in swimming
Swimmers at the 2018 Commonwealth Games
Commonwealth Games silver medallists for Canada
World Aquatics Championships medalists in swimming
Medalists at the 2011 Pan American Games
Medalists at the 2015 Pan American Games
Swimmers at the 2020 Summer Olympics
20th-century Canadian women
21st-century Canadian women
Medallists at the 2014 Commonwealth Games
Medallists at the 2018 Commonwealth Games